The Oman-Zanzibar war was a 1784 conflict between Oman and Zanzibar. It was the first time they had fought since 1779. Zanzibar, a colony of Oman, rebelled with the support of African forces from Mombasa and Pemba Island. Oman had to retake Zanzibar by force, capturing it in a short war. The Omani force was dispatched by Hilal bin Ahmad, eldest son of Ahmad bin Said al-Busaidi.

References
 A History of the African People. Robert William July (1998) 
 Historical atlas of Oman Michael Isaac (2004) 

Wars involving Zanzibar
Wars involving Oman
Conflicts in 1784
1784 in Africa
18th century in Oman
18th century in Zanzibar